Phoenix is an unincorporated community in Plaquemines Parish, Louisiana, United States.  

Phoenix is located on the east bank of the Mississippi River on Louisiana Highway 39, on the opposite side of the River from Myrtle Grove. It is the closest town to Fort De La Boulaye Site, a National Historic Landmark.

Education
Plaquemines Parish School Board operates public schools. Phoenix High School in Phoenix serves grades K-12.

References

Louisiana populated places on the Mississippi River
Unincorporated communities in Plaquemines Parish, Louisiana
Unincorporated communities in Louisiana
Unincorporated communities in New Orleans metropolitan area